Brittany Elizabeth Jackson (born July 28, 1983, in Cleveland, Tennessee) is an American basketball player, formerly with the Atlanta Dream of the WNBA.

High school
Jackson played for Bradley Central High School in Cleveland, Tennessee, where she was named a WBCA All-American. She participated in the 2001 WBCA High School All-America Game where she scored five points.

College

She played collegiately at the University of Tennessee under Pat Summitt. Jackson is a 6'0" (183 cm) guard who specializes in three point shooting. She played for the Tennessee Lady Volunteers from 2001 to 2005, helping her team reach the final four of the NCAA Women's Division I Basketball Championship all four seasons and the national championship game in 2003 and 2004.

Tennessee  statistics

Source

Professional
In 2006, she played for the San Jose Spiders of the National Women's Basketball League. She played for Turkish team Burhaniye Belediyespor after one season with the Spiders. In January 2008 she joined Polish team AZS KK Jelenia Góra and shortly afterward, signed with Atlanta, having failed to make the WNBA in her first three post-college season. She also works as a model.

References

1983 births
Living people
Tennessee Lady Volunteers basketball players
American women's basketball players
Point guards
People from Cleveland, Tennessee